Peet or PEET may refer to:

Surname
A surname of English or Dutch origin
Alfred Peet (1920–2007), a Dutch-American entrepreneur and the founder of Peet's Coffee & Tea
Peet's Coffee & Tea, a specialty coffee roaster and retailer founded in 1966
Amanda Peet (born 1972), an American actress
Azalia Emma Peet (1887–1973), American missionary teacher in Japan
Bill Peet (1915–2002), an American children's book illustrator and a story writer for Disney Studios
John Peet (disambiguation), various individuals
Mal Peet (1947–2015), an English author of novels mainly for young adults
Margot Peet (1903–1995), an American painter
Stephen Peet (1920–2005), a British filmmaker
Thomas Eric Peet (1882–1934), an English Egyptologist
Wayne Peet (born 1954), an American jazz pianist and organist

Given name
Peet Aren (1889–1970), Estonian artist
Peet Coombes (1952–1997), English musician
Peet Johanson (1881–1939), Estonian politician
Peet Kask (born 1948), Estonian politician
Peet Petersen (1941–1980), Dutch soccer player
Peet Pienaar (born 1971), South African performance artist
Peet Stol (1880–1956), Dutch footballer

Others
Rogers Peet, a men's clothing company founded in 1874
Rogers Peet Building, a five-story structure built in Manhattan in 1863
Peet Brothers, a Kansas-based soap manufacturer that merged with Palmolive to become Palmolive-Peet, and later Colgate-Palmolive
Peet Limited, Australian real estate company

See also
Peets, surname
Peat, an accumulation of partially decayed vegetation matter
Peat (disambiguation)
Pete (disambiguation)

Dutch masculine given names
Estonian masculine given names